James Todd Spader (born February 7, 1960) is an American actor. He is known for often portraying eccentric and morally ambiguous characters. He started his career in critically acclaimed independent films before transitioning into television for which he received numerous awards and acclaim including three Primetime Emmy Awards as well as nominations for three Golden Globe Awards, and ten Screen Actors Guild Awards.

Spader started his career acting in supporting roles in films such as Pretty in Pink (1986), Mannequin, and Wall Street (both 1987). His breakthrough role came with the Steven Soderbergh drama Sex, Lies, and Videotape (1989) for which he received the Cannes Film Festival Award for Best Actor. He then starred in films such as True Colors (1991),  Stargate (1994), Crash (1996), and Secretary (2002). Spader took supporting roles in Bob Roberts (1992), Wolf (1994), Lincoln (2012), and The Homesman (2014). He also voiced the role of Ultron in Avengers: Age of Ultron (2015).

His television roles include those of attorney Alan Shore in the last season of The Practice (2003–2004) and its spin-off Boston Legal (2004–2008), a role which earned him three Primetime Emmy Awards for Outstanding Lead Actor in a Drama Series He's also known for his role as Robert California in the sitcom The Office (2011–2012). He currently stars as Raymond "Red" Reddington in the NBC crime series The Blacklist (2013–present).

Early life and education 
Spader was born on February 7, 1960, in Boston and is the youngest of three children. His parents, Jean (née Fraser) and Stoddard ("Todd") Greenwood Spader, were both teachers. He has two older sisters, Libby Spader and Annie Spader. According to Spader, he had a very progressive and liberal upbringing. "I was always around dominant and influential women, and that left a great impression". Spader is a sixth-generation descendant of Connecticut politician Seth P. Beers, Co-Founder of American School for the Deaf Laurent Clerc is his 3rd great-grandfather.

During his early education, he attended many private schools, including The Pike School in Andover where his mother taught art, and the Brooks School in North Andover where his father was a teacher. He later transferred to Phillips Academy, befriended former President John F. Kennedy's son John F. Kennedy, Jr., dropped out at the age of seventeen, and moved to New York City to pursue his acting career. While studying to become a full-time actor, Spader undertook jobs including bartending, teaching yoga, driving a meat truck, loading railroad cars, and being a stable boy.

Acting career 

Spader's first major film role was in the film Endless Love (1981), and his first starring role was in Tuff Turf (1985). He rose to stardom in 1986, when he played the rich, arrogant playboy Steff in Pretty in Pink. He co-starred in Mannequin (1987) and the film adaptation of Less than Zero (1987), in which he played a drug dealer named Rip. Supporting roles in films such as Baby Boom (1987) and Wall Street (1987) followed until his breakthrough in Sex, Lies, and Videotape (1989), in which he played a sexual voyeur who complicates the lives of three Baton Rouge, Louisiana residents. For this performance he received the Best Actor Award at the Cannes Film Festival.

Spader's roles in the early 1990s included a young, affluent widower opposite Susan Sarandon in the romantic drama White Palace (1990), a yuppie who meets the mysterious Rob Lowe in the Noir drama Bad Influence (1990), John Cusack's best friend in the drama True Colors (1991), and a poker-playing drifter in The Music of Chance (1993). In 1994 he starred as Egyptologist Daniel Jackson in the sci-fi film Stargate. In 1996 he played car accident fetishist James Ballard in the controversial Canadian film Crash and assassin Lee Woods in 2 Days in the Valley. In 1997 Spader guest starred in the Seinfeld episode "The Apology", as an angry recovering alcoholic who refuses to apologize to George for making fun of him. In 2000 he played a drug-addicted detective tracking a serial killer in The Watcher. In 2002 he starred as a sadomasochistic boss in Secretary.

From 2004 to 2008 Spader starred as Alan Shore in the series Boston Legal, in which he reprised his role from the television series The Practice (2002). Longtime writer-producer David E. Kelley said there was resistance when he first tried to cast Spader in the role, "I was told that no one would ever welcome James Spader into their living room". During a TV Game Changers interview Kelley noted, "People will watch him (Spader) in the movies, but they will never let him in their own home."

He won the Emmy Award for Outstanding Lead Actor in a Drama Series in 2004 for his portrayal on The Practice and won it again in 2005 and 2007 for Boston Legal. With the 2005 win, he became one of only a few actors to win an Emmy Award while playing the same character in two series. Even rarer, he won a second consecutive Emmy while playing the same character in two series. He also won the Satellite Award for Best Actor in a Series, Comedy or Musical for Boston Legal in 2006.

In October 2006, Spader narrated "China Revealed", the first episode of Discovery Channel's documentary series Discovery Atlas. He also did voice-over in several television commercials for Acura. He starred in Race, a play written and directed by David Mamet, which opened on December 6, 2009, at the Ethel Barrymore Theatre on Broadway. The show closed on August 21, 2010, after 297 performances. In March 2011, he was named to star in the film By Virtue Fall, written and to be directed by Sheldon Turner. , the movie was in pre-production.

Spader guest starred as Robert California in "Search Committee", the season 7 finale of The Office. On June 27, 2011, it was announced that he would join the cast on a permanent basis. He planned to stay only through the eighth season. While the original plan was just to do the guest appearance, executive producer Paul Lieberstein said: "those two scenes became a season".

Spader stars in the television series, The Blacklist, which premiered on NBC September 23, 2013. He portrays Raymond "Red" Reddington, one of the FBI's most wanted fugitives. He also played villainous robot Ultron in Avengers: Age of Ultron (2015).

Personal life 
Spader met his first wife, decorator Victoria Kheel, while working in a yoga studio after he moved to New York City in the 1980s. They married in 1987 and had two sons. Spader filed for divorce from Kheel in 2004. He began dating his former Alien Hunter (2003) co-star, Leslie Stefanson, in 2002. They have one son together.

In an interview with Rolling Stone in 2014, Spader revealed he has obsessive–compulsive disorder.

Filmography

Film

Television

Awards and nominations

References

External links 

 
 
 
 

1960 births
Living people
Male actors from Boston
American male film actors
American male television actors
Cannes Film Festival Award for Best Actor winners
Outstanding Performance by a Lead Actor in a Drama Series Primetime Emmy Award winners
Phillips Academy alumni
20th-century American male actors
21st-century American male actors
Brooks School alumni
People with obsessive–compulsive disorder